The Economic Affairs Committee is one of the eight standing committees of the French National Assembly.

Chairmen 

 Roland Lescure - 15th legislature of the French Fifth Republic

References 

Committees of the National Assembly (France)
Economy of France
Politics of France